lastlog is a program available on most Linux distributions. It formats and prints the contents of the last login log file, /var/log/lastlog (which is a usually a very sparse file), including the login name, port, and last login date and time.  It is similar in functionality to the BSD program last, also included in Linux distributions; however, last parses a different binary database file (/var/log/wtmp and /var/log/btmp).

Usage 
Lastlog prints its output in column format with login-name, port, and last-login-time of each and every user on the system mentioned in that order. The users are sorted by default according to the order in /etc/passwd However, it can also be used to modify the records kept in /var/log/lastlog.$ lastlog
Username         Port     From             Latest
root                                       **Never logged in**
user            tty3                        Sun Jan 14 16:29:24 +0130 2019

External links 
 

Unix user management and support-related utilities